Ugolino di Prete Ilario was an Italian painter.  He was born in Siena, and executed frescoes (1364) in the chapel of San Corporale in the Orvieto Cathedral. In 1378 he was employed with other artists on the decoration of the walls of the tribune and choir behind the high altar of the same church. One of his pupils was Cola Petruccioli.

References

14th-century Italian painters
Italian male painters
Painters from Siena
Year of death unknown
Year of birth unknown